St Michael's Prep School is a coeducational preparatory school in Otford, located in a  site in the North Downs, Kent, England.

History
St Michael's was founded at Hatcham in 1872 by the Reverend Arthur Tooth as a school and home for the sons of the clergy, naval and military officers as well as professionals who had suffered bereavement or fallen on hard times. The school now has more than 460 pupils.

Historic abuse allegations

In 2005, actor John Hurt stated in an interview with the Independent on Sunday that when he was a pupil at the school he was abused by Donald Cormack, then Senior Master of the school; he later became Head Teacher until his retirement in 1981. Hurt said that the experience affected him "hugely". According to the interviewer, he and Hurt had a mutual friend who had earlier made the same allegations to him.

Notable alumni

Teachers
Roy Martin Haines

Pupils
Hubert Chesshyre, Clarenceux King of Arms, Secretary of the Order of the Garter,
John Hurt, actor
Roy Martin Haines, historian
Tom Bosworth - represented his country in race walking in the 2010 Commonwealth Games.
Lizzy Yarnold - silver medallist in the 2011 Bob Skeleton Junior World Championships, 2014 winter Olympic gold medalist, 2018 winter Olympic gold medalist

Further reading
Sally Maria Jones, St Michael's School, Otford: Recollections, Observations, and Celebrations. The Story of St Michael's School, Otford, Since its Foundation in Hatcham, New Cross, in 1872 (Sevenoaks: Amherst, 2004; 255pp., with illustrations and portraits)

References

External links
School website

Educational institutions established in 1972
Preparatory schools in Kent
Child sexual abuse scandals in Anglicanism
School sexual abuse scandals
Child abuse in England
Anglo-Catholic educational establishments

1972 establishments in England
Violence against men in the United Kingdom